Ted Hutt is a British Grammy Award-winning record producer, musician, and songwriter, residing in Los Angeles, California, United States. He was the original guitar player and one of the founding members for The Promise, The Great Unwashed, Gods Hotel, Reacharound, and Flogging Molly.

Career
After his departure from Flogging Molly, to pursue record production, Hutt has worked with The Gaslight Anthem, Flogging Molly, including their RIAA certified Gold recording Drunken Lullabies and its followup Within a Mile of Home, The Bouncing Souls, Lucero, Dropkick Murphys, Nahko and Medicine for the People, The Devil Makes Three, Violent Femmes, Tiger Army, Brian Fallon, Old Crow Medicine Show and The Mighty Mighty Bosstones amongst other notable artists.

In December 2008 eMusic named The '59 Sound by The Gaslight Anthem the best album of 2008. NME rated it as one of the best album of the year. The album's title track was included in Rolling Stone's top 100 songs of the year. and received an 8.6/10 rating from Pitchfork Media.

Hutt also produced the band's third album American Slang for SideOneDummy. Recorded at Magic Shop Studios NYC and released June 15, 2010 it debuted at number 16 on Billboard 200, number 18 on the UK Albums Chart and number 1 on both US and UK indie top 100s. It also featured a song "The Diamond Church Street Choir" which was number 39 in Rolling Stone'''s top 50 songs of 2010 and the album was included in a number of major publication's best of 2010 lists including Spin, Kerrang!, Uncut and the UK style and music magazine Clash. Both The '59 Sound has been certified Gold and American Slang  Silver in the UK by the BPI.

Also in 2010, Hutt produced and mixed the Dropkick Murphy's Going Out In Style. Recorded in Cambridge Mass at Q Division Studio's it features a guest appearance by Bruce Springsteen. It was released March 1, 2011 entering the Billboard 200 chart at number 6, making it the highest charting album in the band's history, selling 43,000 copies in its first week.  He produced and mixed Gaslight Anthem Brian Fallons new project The Horrible Crowes "Elsie". On December 2, 2011, Huffington Post blogger Jon Chattman named "Elsie" the number 2 album of 2011. He wrote, "Out of nowhere, this Gaslight Anthem (don't call it a) side project resonated with me so strongly. There's not a bad song on this."
Also Old Crow Medicine Show's Carry Me Back sold over 17,000 copies in its debut week, landing at number 22 on the Billboard 200 in August 2012, leading to both the band's best ever sales week and their highest ever charting position. The album also was number 1 on both the Bluegrass and Folk charts and number 4 in the Country album in the nation  It remained on the Billboard Bluegrass Chart for over 21 weeks. Later that year he produced the Dropkick Murphy's second top 10 album Signed and Sealed in Blood  which reached number 9 on the Billboard 200 in January 2013.

In 2014, Hutt produced and mixed the Old Crow Medicine Show album, Remedy, which reached number 15 on Billboard 200 and was the 57th Annual Grammy Awards winner for Best Folk Album. The song "Sweet Amarillo" was number 20 on Rolling Stones 50 best songs of 2014. Also, in the same year, he recorded Getting Through with The Riptide Movement at Grouse Lodge Studios, County Westmeath, Ireland, released on 4 April 2014 by Universal Music Group.  It reached number #1 on the Irish Albums Chart and was certified Gold by the IRMA.

In 2015, Hutt produced and mixed Go Betty Go's first recording in a decade, an EP titled Reboot.  He also produced all of their previous releases.

In 2016, he produced his third Dropkick Murphys record, which was also the third produced by Hutt to make the top 10 on the US chart. Recorded at Sonic Ranch in El Paso, Texas, 11 Short Stories of Pain & Glory'' was released on January 6, 2017, and reached number 8 on the Billboard 200 and number 1 on both the Billboard Alternative and Rock Charts.

In June 2019, Hutt, alongside The Pogues James Fearnley and Marc Orrell of Dropkick Murphys, announced the formation of a new supergroup, The Walker Roaders. The Walker Roaders' debut record was released on August 23, 2019.

Production discography

References

External links
Ted Hutt Discography at Worlds End
[ Ted Hutt Discography at All Music]
Ted Hutt Discography at Discogs

Living people
Year of birth missing (living people)